Louis Labeyrie (born 11 February 1992) is a French professional basketball player for UNICS Kazan of the VTB United League.

Professional career
From 2008 to 2011, Labeyrie played for Fos Provence Basket. In 2011, he signed with Hyeres-Toulon for the 2011–12 season.

On 10 July 2012 he signed a three-year deal with Paris-Levallois.

In July 2015 he joined the Knicks for the NBA Summer League.

On 27 July 2018 Labeyrie signed a two-year deal with Valencia Basket of the Liga ACB. He extended his contract for two seasons on 3 July 2020. On 27 July 2022, Labeyrie signed with BC UNICS of the VTB United League.

Draft rights 
On 26 June 2014, Labeyrie was selected with the 57th overall pick in the 2014 NBA draft by the Indiana Pacers. He was later traded to the New York Knicks on draft night. On 3 January 2022, the New York Knicks traded Labeyrie's draft rights to the Los Angeles Lakers, as part of a three team deal that also included the Cleveland Cavaliers.

Career statistics

EuroLeague

|-
| style="text-align:left;"| 2019–20
| style="text-align:left;"| Valencia
| 27 || 16 || 20.3 || .495 || .324 || .786 || 4.6 || .7 || .5 || .3 || 5.1 || 8.7
|- class="sortbottom"
| align=center colspan="2"| Career
| 27 || 16 || 20.3 || .495 || .324 || .786 || 4.6 || .7 || .5 || .3 || 5.1 || 8.7

References

External links
 Louis Labeyrie at eurobasket.com
 Louis Labeyrie at euroleague.net

1992 births
Living people
2019 FIBA Basketball World Cup players
BC UNICS players
Black French sportspeople
Centers (basketball)
Fos Provence Basket players
French expatriate basketball people in Spain
French men's basketball players
HTV Basket players
Indiana Pacers draft picks
Liga ACB players
Metropolitans 92 players
People from Gonesse
Power forwards (basketball)
SIG Basket players
Sportspeople from Val-d'Oise
Valencia Basket players